Braitling is a suburb of the town of Alice Springs in the Northern Territory, Australia.

The suburb is named after Bill and Doreen Braitling, who established Mount Doreen Station in 1930.

References

Suburbs of Alice Springs